KBUB (90.3 FM) is a radio station broadcasting a country gospel music format. Licensed to Brownwood, Texas, United States, the station is currently owned by Blm of Brownwood and features programming from Salem Communications.

History
On December 23, 2005, the station was sold to Living Word Church Of Brownwood and on March 27, 2008, the station was sold to BLM of Brownwood.

References

External links
 

BUB